This is a list of Universities in the United Kingdom by the date of their foundation as universities.

In many cases the supposed date of foundation as a university is open to debate, particularly for the ancient universities. Modern universities have seen similar debate, with some universities having a heritage as educational institutions that pre-dates their current foundation or recognition as a university by over a hundred years, e.g. the use of 'Est 1824' on the  University of Manchester logo, reflecting the initial foundations of the Manchester Mechanics' Institute and the Manchester Royal School of Medicine in that year, despite the current foundation having been established (by the merger of two existing universities) in 2004. For the modern (post 1800) universities, the date of achieving university status (by royal charter, act of parliament, order in council, or decision of Companies House) is given. Former universities with extant successor institutions in the UK are given in italics.

Ancient universities

Until the nineteenth century there were only two successful long-term university establishments in England and five in Scotland (including two in Aberdeen, see below). This excludes the original University of Northampton, which gained university status in 1261 before being abolished in 1265.

Nineteenth-century universities
No new universities were successfully founded in England or Scotland after 1600 until the nineteenth century, although the eighteenth century saw the establishment of a number of dissenting academies, medical schools such as St George's (1733) and the London Hospital Medical College (1785), and the Royal Veterinary College (1791).

The University of Wales and the Victoria University were founded as federal universities incorporating earlier colleges and the University of London was founded as an examination board (becoming a federal university in 1900).  The federal universities are discussed further below.

The Andersonian Institute, a precursor of the University of Strathclyde, was established in 1796 and used the title Anderson's University between 1828 and 1887, but the University of Strathclyde did not receive a royal charter granting university status until 1964. Similarly, University College London used the title London University without being granted university status from 1826 to 1836. Both St Patrick's College, Maynooth (from 1896) and the
Catholic University of Ireland (1854–1911) were universities by Papal Bull but were never recognised as such by the British state.

Civic universities
These universities were distinguished by being non-collegiate (and thus, at the time, non-residential) institutions founded as university colleges that admitted men without reference to religion and concentrated on imparting to their students "real-world" skills, often linked to engineering. All were established as universities by royal charter, with an accompanying act of parliament to transfer the property and assets of the university college to the newly incorporated university. As this article lists universities by date of foundation, this section lists only the universities that gained their status in the period 1900–1959. There are some institutions generally regarded as civic universities and sharing many elements of common history with these universities that gained university status later than this (e.g. Newcastle in 1963 or Cardiff in 2005); these are listed under the appropriate time period.

First wave of civic universities

The large civic "red brick" universities all gained official university status before the First World War. The term was first coined by a professor at the University of Liverpool to describe these universities, inspired by the university's Victoria Building which is built from a distinctive red pressed brick. All of the red brick institutions in Great Britain have origins dating back to older medical or engineering colleges which prepared students for University of London external examination; many were also members of the federal Victoria University for a period.

Second wave of civic universities
The second wave of civic universities differed from the later "plate glass universities" in that they all evolved from local university colleges founded before the Second World War and all prepared students for external University of London examinations before being granted full university status. They are distinguished from the "red brick" universities only by their date of foundation as universities, and are often classed together.

1960s universities
The 1960s saw the number of UK universities more than double from 22 to 45. Universities founded during the 1960s divide into two main groups: the plateglass universities, so called because of their dominant architectural style, and the former colleges of advanced technology that were converted to universities following the Robbins Report.

The plate glass universities are differentiated from the civic universities by not having been university colleges submitting students for external examination, but instead being created ab initio as universities with their own degree-awarding powers (under the supervision of academic oversight councils). The decision to create the plateglass universities was taken prior to the Robbins Report, and the report mentions them as being in the process of being established (Chapter IV). The approach of creating institutions with degree-awarding powers was pioneered by the University of Keele, which was established in 1949 as the University College of North Staffordshire with its own degree award powers, under the oversight of Oxford, Manchester and Birmingham.

The status of college of advanced technology (CAT) was created in the 1950s, although many of the institutes so designated dated back much further. The CATs were distinct from university colleges (although like them they prepared students for London degrees) and, along with their Scottish counterparts, were recommended to be converted into universities by the Robbins Report (Chapter X). They all entered the university sector in the 1960s, although some became colleges of federal universities rather than universities in their own right.

In addition to these, some civic universities (Dundee, Newcastle and, arguably, Keele) gained university status in this period. Dundee and Newcastle were, like the redbrick universities, recognised as university colleges from the start of the grant-in-aid programme in 1889, making them the last of the English first-wave civic universities to become universities in their own right. Keele was founded as a university college, although (as mentioned above) with its own degree awarding powers, and was considered to be a second-wave civic university by Robbins. The Open University is also unusual, being the UK's only public distance learning university.

The New University of Ulster (NUU), which incorporated Magee College originating in 1865, was founded in 1968, but subsequently merged with the Ulster Polytechnic to form the University of Ulster (see below).

1980s universities
After the explosion in university numbers of the 1960s, no new universities were established until the 1980s. Both of the 1980s universities are unusual: the University of Buckingham was Britain's first private university since the creation of the University Grants Committee after the First World War extended state funding to Oxford, Cambridge and Durham, while Ulster University was formed from the merger of a plate glass university with a polytechnic.

New universities

Post-1992 universities
The passage of the Further and Higher Education Act 1992 allowed all polytechnics and Scottish central institutions to become universities and award their own degrees rather than degrees governed by the Council for National Academic Awards (CNAA). Thirty-eight (including institutions later merged) took up the offer immediately, nearly doubling the number universities again from 46 to 84 (and 89 by 1994). While commonly referred to as "post-1992 universities" (or new universities), many of these institutions claim heritage back to the nineteenth century.

Cranfield and UMIST (now merged into Manchester) both achieved university status in this period via royal charter rather than under the provisions of the 1992 act and are not generally regarded as "new universities". They are listed here with the 1992 universities to reflect the date when they gained their status.

Due to the way in which these universities were created only days apart, all of the universities created in 1992 are listed alphabetically.

Second wave of new universities

After the conversion of the polytechnics and central institutions under the 1992 Act there was a pause before a second wave of institutions gained university status in the 21st century. These were university colleges and other higher education institutions that had gained degree awarding powers since 1992 rather than being granted them on the break up of the CNAA.

From 1999, higher education policy has been a devolved power, although the actual award of university and degree awarding powers remains with the UK Privy Council. In 2004, the requirement that institutes gain research degree awarding powers before they could gain university status was dropped in England and Wales (but not in Scotland or Northern Ireland), although they were still required to have 4000 full-time equivalent students, with 3000 on degree courses. Eight university colleges without research degree awarding powers became universities in 2005. In 2012, the student numbers criterion for institutions in England was relaxed to 1000 full-time equivalent students (with 750 on degree courses) and a number of university colleges became universities. New guidance for England issued in September 2015 replaces the requirement for 750 students to be studying degree courses with a requirement that 55% of students are studying on degree courses.

This was also the era of the break-up of the federal University of Wales and the accreditation of its constituent colleges as individual universities, the secession of Imperial College from the University of London, and of mergers between a number of institutes that already had university status but which were dissolved to form a new university. In the case of many of these, the university so formed owes its status to a Royal Charter rather than the provisions of the 1992 act, making it legally distinct from the "new universities". As with the earlier overlap between plate glass and civic universities, these new "old universities" are listed here as institutions that became universities in the 21st century.

Up to July 2018, 51 further new universities have been created (including those created by mergers of existing universities) since 2000, bringing the total number to 132, of which 106 (including the Open University, which operates in all four countries of the UK, and 5 private universities) are in England, 9 in Wales, 2 in Northern Ireland, and 15 in Scotland.

Recognised bodies without university status

Some recognised bodies (bodies with degree awarding powers) have not been formally granted university status. Educational institutions with their own degree awarding powers but which are not formally recognised as universities are listed here by date of receiving their degree awarding powers. This table does not include colleges of the University of London (all of which are recognised bodies with the authority to grant University of London degrees, and many of which also have their own degree awarding powers), which are listed below.

Federal universities 

Some institutions were members of federal universities as university-level institutions before becoming universities in their own right.

University of London 
The University of London was formed as a degree-awarding examining board in 1836 in response to the application of University College London (UCL) to be chartered as a university. It originally operated a system of affiliated institutions with two registers: one (controlled by the government) of institutions allowed to submit students for examination for Arts and Law degrees, and a second (controlled by the university) of institutions allowed to submit students for medical degrees. Apart from being allowed to submit students for London examinations, there was no connection between the affiliated colleges and the university.

In 1858, the affiliation system was abandoned for Arts and Law degrees, with these being opened to anyone willing to travel to London for the examinations. In 1900, following a period of pressure from UCL and King's College London (KCL), the university was reorganised as a federal body after the model of the Victoria University and the University of Wales. Degrees were reorganised as external (the earlier open examinations, now University of London (Worldwide)) and internal (for students at  London institutions that became schools of the university).

In 2005–2006 UCL, KCL, the London School of Economics and Imperial College London gained the right to award degrees in their own name, although this right was not exercised until 2007. In 2007 Imperial College left the federation and became an independent university. Other institutions have since gone on to gain their own degree awarding powers, and a number of institutions have recently joined the federal structure. The University of London Act 2018 allowed member institutions to become universities in their own right while remaining part of the federal university; in February 2019 twelve colleges said they were applying to become universities.

Former members of federal universities

Former federal universities in Great Britain include the Victoria University, the University of Wales, the University of St Andrews, the University of Durham, and the Federal University of Surrey. In the first two cases, the federal university merged with one of its colleges when it broke up (a process still ongoing as of July 2018 for Wales) while in the other three cases, where the university had previously existed as a non-federal body, it simply reverted to that status. In Ireland the Queen's University of Ireland was succeeded by the Royal University of Ireland which was succeeded (without Belfast) by the National University of Ireland, which continued to exist after Irish independence.

The longest lived of these federal institutions was the University of Wales, which was founded by royal charter in 1893 with the federation of University College Wales (now Aberystwyth University), University College North Wales (now Bangor University) and University College South Wales and Monmouthshire (now Cardiff University). Prior to this, students at these university colleges prepared for examinations of the University of London. The university grew with the addition of further colleges, and in 1971 St David's College, Lampeter (now part of the University of Wales Trinity Saint David), Wales' oldest degree-awarding institution, suspended its own degree-awarding powers and entered the University of Wales as St David's University College.

In 2007 the university changed from a federal structure to a confederation of independent institutions, allowing individual institutions which had gained the status of universities in their own right to use the title of university, and in 2008 Aberystwyth, Bangor and Swansea Universities decided to exercise their right to award their own degrees. This led to the effective break-up of the university in 2011, with it being decided that the University of Wales would merge with the University of Wales Trinity Saint David and no longer accredit other institutions. From August 2017 the two institutions have been functionally integrated although a legal merger has not (as of July 2018) been finalised.

This table of former members of federal universities is sorted primarily by when they became part of a federal university, with date of institutional foundation as a secondary index.

Former universities
This table contains universities that were officially recognised but were dissolved either by merging, splitting or just closing down.  It does not include institutions which did not receive official recognition as universities, such as the attempt to found a university at Stamford in the 14th century, Cromwell's New College, Durham in the 17th century, or colleges of the federal universities of Wales and London that never became independent universities. It also does not include universities in the Republic of Ireland that ceased to be UK universities on independence from the UK.

Timeline of university numbers

Universities and university colleges in overseas territories

These are not considered UK universities and are not recognised as degree-awarding bodies by the British government.

See also
Armorial of UK universities
List of oldest universities in continuous operation
List of universities in the United Kingdom
List of universities in the United Kingdom by enrolment
List of UK universities by endowment
Third oldest university in England debate
Universities in the United Kingdom

Notes

Universities in the United Kingdom
Foundation Date